Doug Moran (born 29 July 1934 in Musselburgh) is a Scottish former professional footballer. Moran is one of only three players to score more than 100 senior goals for Falkirk. During his career he made over 100 appearances for Ipswich Town.

Honours
Falkirk
Scottish Cup: 1956-57

Ipswich Town
Football League First Division: 1961–62

Individual
Ipswich Town Hall of Fame: Inducted 2011

References

External links 

Doug Moran at Pride of Anglia

1934 births
Living people
Sportspeople from Musselburgh
Scottish footballers
Association football inside forwards
Hibernian F.C. players
Falkirk F.C. players
Ipswich Town F.C. players
Dundee United F.C. players
Cowdenbeath F.C. players
Gala Fairydean Rovers F.C. players
Scottish Football League players
English Football League players
Footballers from East Lothian